Orca Inlet is an arm of Prince William Sound in southern Alaska. The town of Cordova was founded on its coast in 1906. All marine traffic reaches the town through Orca Inlet.

Geography

The south end opens into the Gulf of Alaska while the north end joins with Orca Bay.

The city of Cordova, Alaska is situated on the southeast shore of Orca Inlet.

History
Orca Inlet was listed in the Geographic Dictionary of Alaska in 1906, citing J.F. Moser's report from 1897.  The Orca Cannery operated on the south shore of the inlet; there was a post office at that location from 1894. The Odiak Cannery was located 3 miles (4.8 km) southwest of Orca, at the present location of Cordova.

There were once large Pacific razor clam beds in the intertidal zones of Orca Inlet which were harvested and shipped out of Cordova. Harvests reached 3.5 million pounds (1.6 million kilograms) at its peak. Populations began to decline in the late 1950s. When the 1964 Good Friday earthquake struck the clam beds were uplifted around  exposing them out of the intertidal zone. This led to moderate mortality and eventually the industry crashed.

Geology and currents
Like other arms of Prince William Sound, Orca Inlet is a fjord. There are large areas on its coast with large rounded rocks as well as many cirques and hanging valleys. Glacial erosion created steep walls on the sides of the fjord. In one area the elevation rises to  within  of the coastline. The southern and central areas are filled with sediment making the area very shallow. These deposits resulted from the receded glacier that once filled the fjord as well as current inflow through the seaward end of the inlet from the Copper River and other smaller glacial streams. These deposits drift westward along the coast until they reach the entrance of Orca Inlet. Orca Inlet can serve as an entrance to Prince William Sound from the Gulf of Alaska but the shallow water limits the size of vessels that can use the route.

Copper ore has been found in the area around Orca Inlet but there has been little development to mine it.

The tidal current flows southward on the flood and northward on the ebb.

Gallery

See also
Orca Bay, on the north west side of Hawkins Island

References

Bays of Alaska
Bodies of water of Chugach Census Area, Alaska
Cordova, Alaska